

Medieval Times

Sosso Empire
c. 970 — c. 1240 Decline of the Ghana Empire
c. 1,075 Almoravid conquest of the Ghana Empire
c. 1100 — c. 1235 Aftermath and Sosso Occupation
c. 1217 — c. 1230 Pre-imperial expansion of the Mali Empire
c. 1217 — c. 1255 Campaigns of Sundiata Keita
c. 1235 Battle of Kirina
c. 1217 — c. 1255 Campaigns of Fakoli and Fran

Mali Empire
1235 — 1230 Pre-imperial expansion 
c. 1235 — c. 1255 Campaigns of Sundiata Keita
c. 1235 Battle of Kirina
c. 1235 — c. 1255 Campaigns of Fakoli and Fran
1235 — 1250 Early imperial expansion of the Mali Empire
1235 — 1255 Tiramakhan's western campaign
1255 — 1270 Expansion under Mansa Ouali I
Civil war and rebellion
1285 — 1300 Re-conquest and expansion under Mansa Sakura
1300 — 1337 The empire at its zenith
1337 — 1440 The fragmenting empire
1337 — 1440 The secession of Gao and the Mossi raids
The Jolof Empire
1374 The Eastern Revolt
c. 1400 The Sandaki usurpation and second Mossi raid
The Diawara Revolt
c. 1433 The Tuareg invasion

1440 — 1490 The empire on the defensive
The Portuguese
Songhai hegemony
Tengela War
1500 — 1600 Collapse of the Mali empire
Songhay hegemony in the Sahel
The Songhay respite and the battle for Bambuk
The Rise of the Kaabu Empire
The Sack of Niani
Further losses
April 26, 1599 Battle of Jenné

Songhai Empire
1440 — 1490 The Mali Empire on the Defensive
The Portuguese
Songhai hegemony
Tengela War
1500 — 1600 Collapse of the Mali Empire
Songhay hegemony in the Sahel
The Songhay respite and the Battle for Bambuk
The Rise of the Kaabu Empire
The Sack of Niani
Further losses
April 26, 1599 Battle of Jenné
1578 — 1603  Campaigns of Ahmad al-Mansur of the Saadi dynasty of Morocco
October 16, 1590 — March 13, 1591 Songhai campaign
March 13, 1591 Battle of Tondibi
 April 26, 1599 Battle of Jenné

Modern Times

Massina Empire

c. 1776 — April 20, 1845 Campaigns of Seku Amadu
1810 — 1818 Jihad of Seku Amadu

Toucouleur Empire
c. 1797 — 1864 Campaigns of El Hadj Umar Tall
1848 — 1864  Initial conquests
1659 — 1958 French colonisation in Africa
April 1857 Siege of Medina Fort
March 10, 1861 — March 16, 1862 Conquest of the Bamana Empire
March 10, 1861 Battle of Segou

Wassoulou Empire
1883 — 1886  Mandingo Wars

Republic of Mali
1916 — 2012 Tuareg rebellions
1962 — 1964 First Tuareg rebellion
1985 Agacher Strip War
1990 — 1995 Azawad insurgency and Malian civil war
October 7, 2001 — ongoing War on Terror
2002 — ongoing Insurgency in the Maghreb
February 6, 2007 — ongoing Operation Enduring Freedom – Trans Sahara
February 2007 — May 2009 Second Tuareg rebellion
December 8, 2010 — ongoing Arab Spring
2012 — ongoing Northern Mali conflict
2012 — Third Tuareg Rebellion
January 18, 2012 — March 11, 2012 Battle of Tessalit
January 17, 2012 — January 25, 2012 Battle of Aguelhok
February 7, 2012 — February 8, 2012 Battle of Tinzaouaten
March 21, 2012 — April 8, 2012 Malian coup d'état
June 27, 2012 — ongoing Internal conflict in Azawad
June 26, 2012 — June 27, 2012 Battle of Gao
November 16, 2012 — November 20, 2012 Battle of Menaka
February 22, 2013 — February 23, 2013 Battle of Khalil
March 29, 2013 — March 30, 2013 Battle of In Arab
January 11, 2013 — ongoing Operation Serval

See also
List of wars involving Mali
Military of Mali
Mali Army
Mali Air Force
Military history of the Mali Empire
Military history of Africa
African military systems to 1800
African military systems 1800 — 1900
African military systems after 1900

Military history of Mali
Conflicts
Conflicts